The scene subculture is a youth subculture that emerged during the early 2000s in the United States from the pre-existing emo subculture. The subculture became popular with adolescents from the mid-2000s to early 2010s. Members of the scene subculture are referred to as scene kids, trendies, or scenesters. Scene fashion consists of skinny jeans, bright colored clothing, a signature hairstyle consisting of straight, flat hair with long fringes covering their forehead, and bright colored hair dye. Music genres associated with the scene subculture include metalcore, crunkcore, deathcore, electronic music, and pop punk.

From the mid-2000s to early 2010s, scene fashion gained popularity among teens and the music associated with the subculture achieved commercial success in both the underground and the mainstream. Groups like Bring Me the Horizon, Asking Alexandria, Pierce the Veil, and Metro Station garnered mainstream attention and large audiences while still largely being tied to the scene subculture. In the mid-late 2010s, the scene subculture lost popularity; however, since 2019, there have been movements that have given it a revival.

Fashion

Scene fashion is known for its bright colored clothing, skinny jeans, stretched earlobes, sunglasses, piercings, large belt buckles, wristbands, fingerless gloves, eyeliner, hair extensions, and straight, androgynous flat hair with a long fringe covering the forehead and sometimes one or both eyes. Scene people often dye their hair colors like blond, pink, red, green, or bright blue. Members of the scene subculture often shop at Hot Topic. According to The Guardian, a scene girl named Eve O'Brien described scene people as "happy emos".

Music
Scene people are associated with various styles of music including metalcore, deathcore, post-hardcore, crunkcore, electronic music, indie rock, emo pop, and pop punk. Artists commonly associated with the scene subculture include Cute Is What We Aim For, Asking Alexandria, Black Veil Brides, Attack Attack!, We Came As Romans, Bring Me the Horizon, Blood on the Dance Floor, Jeffree Star, Paramore, Mayday Parade, Suicide Silence, the Medic Droid, Breathe Carolina, Escape the Fate, Falling in Reverse, Hawthorne Heights, Lights, Taking Back Sunday, Prima Donna, and Design the Skyline. Many bands associated with the scene subculture gained popularity through the social media website MySpace.

Crunkcore

Crunkcore (also called crunk punk, screamo-crunk and scrunk) is a musical fusion genre that is popular amongst scene kids. Characterized by the combination of cultural and musical elements from crunk, screamo, pop, electronic and dance music, the genre often features screamed vocals, hip hop beats, and sexually provocative lyrics. Notable groups in the genre included Brokencyde, Hollywood Undead, 3OH!3 and Millionaires.

Neon pop-punk

Neon pop-punk is a style of pop punk that was popular amongst scene kids. Defined by a greater influence from pop and electronic music than was traditional in pop punk, popular groups in the style during the height of scene included All Time Low, the Maine, the Cab, Metro Station, Boys Like Girls, Cobra Starship and Forever the Sickest Kids.

History

Origins

Scene originated from the emo subculture in the early-2000s across the United States. The name began being used around 2002, through the term "scene queen", a derogatory term describing attractive, popular women perceived by older hardcore musicians as only being involved in hardcore for the subculture.

"Fashioncore" was an aesthetic originated by Orange County metalcore band Eighteen Visions that helped to originate the scene subculture. Originating as a way of purposely being confrontational to the hypermasculinity of hardcore, it used many aspects that would come to define scene fashion, such as eyeliner, tight jeans, collared shirts, straightened hair and white belts. According to MetalSucks writer Finn McKenty, the quintessential scene haircut was invented by Eighteen Visions bassist Javier Van Huss. Huss, himself, had been inspired to create the haircut from seeing a poster of the band Orgy. in Louder Than Hell by Katherine Turman and John Wiederhorn, Ryan Downey states "Javier [Van Huss] really led the charge with crazy hairstyles and pink and blond and blue chunks in their hair". Though the term began as pejorative against fashionable people in hardcore scene, the style was eventually popularised in the early-2000s through the success of Eighteen Visions, Atreyu and From Autumn to Ashes.

Sass music was also a notable origin of scene. Like fashioncore, Sass was also a deliberate confrontation to hardcore's hyper masculinity, with sass bands doing so through their use of overt homoeroticism. The fashion of many sass musicians, notably Johnny Whitney, lead vocalist for the Blood Brothers, were influential upon the development of scene.

Mainstream success

Scene entered popular culture following the mainstream exposure of the emo subculture, indie pop, pop punk, and hip hop in the mid-2000s. The scene subculture is considered by some to have developed directly from the emo subculture and thus the two are often compared. During the mid-2000s, members of the British and American scene subculture took inspiration from the deathcore music scene. In a 2005 article by Phoenix New Times, writer Chelsea Mueller described the appearance of the band Job for a Cowboy (a band that was deathcore at the time) by writing that the band "may look like scenesters with shaggy emo haircuts and tight pants, and may mock metal greats, but this death-metal band is for real." Mueller described Job for a Cowboy as "five guys in girls' jeans and tight band tee shirts". Another early deathcore group popular among members of the scene subculture is Bring Me the Horizon.

In the following years, the spectrum of scene fashion broadened to include a number of sub-styles taking influence from a wide range of fashion styles. According to PopMatters writer Ethan Stewart, "the most renowned [sub-style of scene] was those who merged the subculture with brightly coloured party fashion", a style he attributed the beginnings of to Cobra Starship vocalist Gabe Saporta and his influence from rave and Harajuku street fashion. He also noted those who took influence from 1980s glam metal fashion, such as the members of Black Veil Brides, Escape the Fate and Falling in Reverse. He attributed the origin of this style to Blessed by a Broken Heart.

Members of the subculture quickly began using MySpace. As the popularity of MySpace grew, the website began to develop some of the earliest internet celebrities, referred to as "scene queens". Notable MySpace scene queens include Audrey Kitching, Jeffree Star and the members of the Millionaires.

The music festival Warped Tour became popular with members of the scene subculture during the 2000s. Artists associated with the  subculture would often play at the festival. Bands influenced by crunkcore, electropop and electronic dance music gained popularity among scene kids during the mid to late 2000s, including Cobra Starship and 3OH!3. Blood on the Dance Floor became especially popular, after Jayy Von Monroe joined as lead singer in 2009.

During the late 2000s, similar subcultures emerged in Asia and Latin America, including the Shamate in China,  the Floggers in Argentina, the Coloridos of Brazil, and the Pokemón in Chile. Like their American counterparts, these scene kids wore brightly colored clothing, androgynous big hair and eyeliner, and identified with the emo pop, indie rock, hip hop, and EDM scene.

By around 2014 the subculture had seen a decline in popularity, while also being influential on the fashion and culture of Tumblr, a website which would eventually develop a number of its own scene queens, such as Halsey. Warped Tour had its last show in 2019 after running annually since 1995.

Revival
The late-2010s saw the growing popularity of musicians who had begun their careers as members of scene bands, most notably Lil Lotus, Blackbear, Post Malone, Mod Sun and Lil Aaron. Within this movement came the mainstream success of emo rap, itself influenced by scene.

Beginning in 2019, there was several movements promoting the return of the subculture, such as #20ninescene (2019) and the "Rawring 20s" (2020s). Websites like SpaceHey and FriendProject, which retain Myspace's early design, have gained popularity among teenagers, and Social-media influencers on Instagram and TikTok have begun adopting scene fashion. Around this time, the subculture was also influential on the development of the e-girls and e-boys subculture, and the development of hyperpop. The Scene festival also returned in 2022 with When We Were Young (festival).

Criticisms

According to an article by The Sydney Morning Herald from March 30, 2008, emo people have criticized the scene subculture, accusing scene people of "ripping off their style." The scene subculture has also been the subject of criticism from members of the heavy metal subculture. Pejorative terms such as "myspace-core", "scenecore" and "mallcore" have been used to describe scene music and artists. These terms mock the use of the suffix "-core" which has been used to describe genres related to the scene subculture such as metalcore, crunkcore, and deathcore. Crunkcore has received criticism and the genre has been poorly received by music reviewers. The Boston Phoenix has mentioned criticism of the style, saying that "the idea that a handful of kids would remix lowest-common-denominator screamo with crunk beats, misappropriated 
gangsterisms, and the extreme garishness of emo fashion was sure to incite hate-filled diatribes". Deathcore has been criticized by members of the heavy metal community for its use of breakdowns.

See also

 E-girls and e-boys
 Emo subculture
 List of pop-punk bands
 List of indie rock bands
 List of emo pop bands

References

External links
"Inside the clash of the teen subcultures" Sydney Morning Herald 30 March 2008

Subcultures
2000s fashion
2010s fashion
2000s fads and trends
2010s fads and trends
Youth culture in the United States
Youth culture in the United Kingdom
Australian youth culture